Route 443 is also known as Ma'ale Beit Horon (Bethoron Ascent), following the ancient east-west trade route connecting the Via Maris and the Way of the Patriarchs. It is the main highway connecting Tel Aviv and Gush Dan with Jerusalem via Modi'in. While technically listed as a regional road, it is for the most part a divided, four-lane highway which utilises some grade separation and interchanges, as well as major at-grade intersections, and thus is not classified as a motorway, even though there is a short motorway section on its western end, connecting it to westbound Highway 1.

Route
Route 443 begins as a local street near downtown Lod. Leaving Lod to the east, it becomes a divided highway, crossing Highway 1 and Highway 6 at the Ben Shemen Interchange, and continuing to Shilat junction, which serves as the entrance for the Modi'in area. It then continues through the West Bank in the Matte Binyamin Regional Council, near Ramallah. Upon passing Givat Ze'ev Junction, its official designation becomes Highway 45 which continues directly to Jerusalem's Highway 50 (Begin Boulevard). A spur, Route 436, also links it with Jerusalem through Giv'at Ze'ev and the Ramot neighborhood.

The Road in Antiquity
The road was used during many battles in antiquity due to its unique geography. It is mentioned in several ancient writings.
In Joshua, it is the location of a battle during the conquest of the Land of Canaan.
In 1 Samuel, the road is used during a battle between the Israelites and the Philistines.
It is also mentioned in 1 Maccabees describing the Battle of Beth Horon between the Macabees and the Seleucid Empire.
Later, it is the location of a battle with the Romans as described by Josephus in Wars of the Jews (Bk II, Ch 19, paragraphs 2 & 8).

As opposed to the modern Highway 1 which twists and turns, rises and falls between mountains and valleys on its way to Jerusalem through the Judean hills, the central portion of Highway 443 runs along a ridge line and maintains a relatively stable grade.see also: Bet-Horon

Use by Palestinian traffic
 

The route crosses into the West Bank just north of Maccabim, and continues thereafter until the junction just north of Givat Ze'ev; Palestinian traffic is permitted to use the road between these two points.

Several access roads connecting Palestinian villages with this section of Route 443 were closed in September 2000 due to the outbreak of the Second Intifada. Frequent fire bomb attacks and fatal shootings on Israeli traffic saw the erection of anti-sniper barricades on parts of the highway adjacent to Palestinian-populated areas.

In March 2008, following a challenge by the Association for Civil Rights in Israel, Israel's Supreme Court permitted for six more months the right of the IDF to limit Palestinian traffic in this section, deeming the restrictions necessary to prevent attacks. On December 29, 2009 Israel's High Court of Justice upheld the ACRI's petition against an IDF order barring Palestinian traffic. The ruling became effective May 28, 2010, and unrestricted Palestinian traffic was again permitted.

Junctions and interchanges (west to east)

References

Limited-access roads in Israel
Roads in Israel
Roads in Israeli-occupied territories